F50 may refer to:

Aircraft 
 AEE F50, a Chinese UAV
 Farman F.50, a French twin-engined tactical night bomber
 Farman F.50 (flying boat), a French maritime reconnaissance aircraft
 Fokker 50, a Dutch turboprop airliner

Automobiles 
 Ferrari F50, an Italian sports car
 Jinbei F50, a Chinese compact MPV
 Toyota Kijang (F50), a Japanese pickup truck

Ships and boats 
 F50 (catamaran), a racing boat
 , a K-class destroyer of the Royal Navy
 , a V-class destroyer of the Royal Navy
 , a Talwar-class frigate of the Indian Navy

Other uses 
 Eating disorder
 ESP F-50, a guitar
 Nikon F50, a camera